is a Japanese international senior high school in Minburi, Bangkok. It is an overseas branch of a Japanese private school, or a Shiritsu zaigai kyoiku shisetsu (私立在外教育施設).

The school is operated by Josuikan Education Co., Ltd. (ジョスイカン　エデュケイション　カンパニー Josuikan Edyukeshon Kanpanī).

See also

 Josuikan Junior and Senior High School
 Japanese migration to Thailand
 Thai-Japanese Association School

References

External links
 Josuikan Bangkok International School 
 Josuikan Bangkok International School (old website) 

2008 establishments in Thailand
Educational institutions established in 2008
Japanese international schools in Thailand
International schools in Bangkok
Shiritsu zaigai kyōiku shisetsu